When the Wind Blows may refer to:

Film and television
 When the Wind Blows (1930 film), a comedy short in the Our Gang series
 When the Wind Blows (1986 film), an animated film based on the graphic novel (see below)
 "When the Wind Blows" (Dallas), a television episode
 "When the Wind Blows" (The Fugitive), a television episode

Literature
 When the Wind Blows (comics), a 1982 graphic novel by Raymond Briggs
 When the Wind Blows (Patterson novel) a 1998 novel by James Patterson
 When the Wind Blows, a 1949 detective novel by Cyril Hare
 When the Wind Blows, a 1981 novel by John Saul

Music

Albums
 When the Wind Blows (soundtrack), from the 1986 film
 When the Wind Blows, by Creedle, 1996
 When the Wind Blows, by Eric Bogle, 1984

Songs
 "When the Wind Blows" (song), from the 1986 film, by David Bowie
 "When the Wild Wind Blows", by Bomb Factory from Another Day, Another Life
 "When the Wild Wind Blows", by Iron Maiden from The Final Frontier
 "When the Wild Wind Blows", by Mansun, a B-side of the single "Negative"
 "When the Wild Wind Blows", by Point of Grace from Steady On
 "When the Wild Wind Blows", by Yoona from A Walk to Remember

See also
Where the Wind Blows